LA-5, La-5, LA 5 or LA5 may refer to:

 Lavochkin La-5, a Soviet fighter aircraft of World War II
 Louisiana Highway 5, a northwest–southeast route in DeSoto Parish, Louisiana
 Louisiana's 5th congressional district, a federal congressional district covering much of northeastern and central Louisiana
 Louisiana's 5th State Senate district, a state senate district primarily in New Orleans, Louisiana
 Louisiana's 5th House of Representatives district, a district in the Louisiana House of Representatives representing parts of Caddo Parish
 Los Angeles City Council District 5, representing Los Angeles communities in the Westside, central-eastern Santa Monica Mountains, and central-southern San Fernando Valley
 Constituency LA-5, a constituency of the Azad Jammu and Kashmir Legislative Assembly in Pakistan
 La5, an Italian television channel
 La Cinq, a former French television channel